Lagerstroemia speciosa (giant crepe-myrtle, Queen's crepe-myrtle, banabá plant, or pride of India, or "Queen's Flower" or "Jarul") is a species of Lagerstroemia native to tropical southern Asia. It is a deciduous tree with bright pink to light purple flowers.

The name "Queen's Flower" is derived from the specific epithet 'reginae' or 'flosreginae', which means "imperial or flower of the queen". The tree bears beautiful attractive flowers in profusion in purple, lilac or pinkish-violet colours, and lasts for many months. Its timber is next only to teak in its strength. It is called Queen Crape myrtle as its flowers look like delicate crape paper.

Etymology
The genus Lagerstroemia was first described by Carl Linnaeus. The name Lagerstroemia recognizes Magnus von Lagerstroem, a Swedish naturalist and a merchant who provided specimens from the East for Linnaeus.

Names
The names in English and other vernacular languages are as under:
 English : Pride of India, Queen Crepe Myrtle.
 
  
 
 
 
 
 
 
 
 

Growth

It has simple leaves with, glabrous, large, elliptic or oblong lanceolate.

The fruits are ellipsoid or sub-globose woody capsules. They are green at first, but later turn brown and finally black. The fruits hang on to the trees. It is easily raised through seeds. It grows best on rich deep alluvial loams and prefers warm, humid and moist soils and can withstand water logging.

Flowering occurs 3–5 years after planting and the main flowering season is April–June with a second flush in July–August. The fruits ripen in November–January. p. 198

Cultivation and uses

It is grown in South East Asia, China India, Bangladesh and the Philippines and even extends to Australia. It is  native to India particularly in the western ghats of India covering Belgaum, north and south Kanara, Malabar and Travancore and also in Assam and West Bengal. It is also widely cultivated as an ornamental plant in tropical and subtropical areas.The leaves of the banabá and other parts are used widely in the Philippines, Taiwan, and Japan as a tea preparation. Banabá herb is one of the 69 herbal plants promoted by the Philippine Department of Health (DOH). In Vietnam, the plant's young leaves are consumed as vegetables, and its old leaves and mature fruit are used in traditional medicine for reducing glucose in blood. The seeds have narcotic properties.

Chemistry
Chemical compounds that have been isolated from the extract include corosolic acid, lager-stroemin, flosin B, and reginin A.

Medicinal uses 
Giant Crape Myrtle's seeds are narcotic, bark and leaves are purgative, roots are astringent, stiumlant and febrifuge (fever removing). Decoction of leaves is used in diabetes. In Manipur, its fruit is used locally  applied for apathy of the mouth

Recognition
Pride of India or Tāmhan in Marathi is recognised as the state flower of the state of Maharashtra in India.

In Hindu mythology, it is said that worshipping Lord Brahma results in blossoming of these flowers of Giant Crape Myrtle and Banaba tree and as such it brings prosperity to the house.

In Buddhism
In Theravada Buddhism, this plant is said to have been used as the tree for achieving enlightenment, or Bodhi by the eleventh Buddha ("Paduma – පදුම"), and the twelfth Buddha (Naarada – නාරද)t. The plant is known as මුරුත (Murutha) in Sinhala and Mahaasona – මහාසොණ in Sanskrit.

Gallery

References

 Huxley, A., ed. (1992). New RHS Dictionary of Gardening 3: 10.

External links

 Flora of Pakistan: Lagerstroemia speciosa

speciosa
Flora of tropical Asia
Medicinal plants of Asia
Taxa named by Carl Linnaeus
Taxa named by Christiaan Hendrik Persoon
Symbols of Maharashtra